Clark Brands, formerly Clark Oil, began as Clark's Super Gas and was a 20th-century oil company headquartered in Milwaukee, Wisconsin.

History
Founded by Emory T. Clark in 1932 as a single filling station on the corner of 60th St. and Greenfield Ave. in West Allis, Wisconsin, Clark Super Gas sold only premium gasoline. Unlike most contemporary service stations, Clark stations did not offer mechanical maintenance and tire changing.

In 1943, the company moved into refining oil.  By the mid-1950s, the company operated nearly 500 gas stations throughout the Midwest, with locations in California, Florida, Illinois, Indiana, Iowa, Michigan, Minnesota, Missouri, Ohio and Wisconsin.

From 1948 to 1950, Clark Super Gas sponsored the Milwaukee Clarks, a minor league ice hockey team in the International Hockey League.

At its height in the 1970s, Clark Oil was the largest independent oil refiner and marketer in the Midwest with 1,489 stations and two refineries, one in Blue Island, Illinois and the other in Hartford, Illinois.  The average Clark station sold twice the number of gallons as the national average, and its emphasis on premium gasoline gave the company a high profit margin.

Emory Clark sold his interest in the company in 1981 to Apex Oil, a St. Louis, Missouri–based company.  In 1985, Apex decided to sell Clark Oil.  By 1987, Clark and Apex were bankrupt.

In 1992, a division of Toronto-based Horsham Corp. bought Clark Oil and Refining, which included the two refineries and around 1,000 gas stations. The company's name was changed to Clark Refining and Marketing. Horsham expanded the company, buying a Lima, Ohio refinery from BP, and a Port Arthur, Texas refinery from Chevron. Horsham became TrizecHahn, and then sold 80% of Clark to The Blackstone Group, another investment firm, and another portion to Occidental Petroleum.

In 1999, the company sold its retail unit and rebranded itself as Premcor. In 2001, many Clark stations in southeast Michigan were closed permanently.  In 2003, Clark Brands, LLC was formed and purchased the Clark brand and other portions of the Clark business, with a primary goal to license the Clark brand to independent operators.  Clark gas stations are now operating throughout 32 states, with over 1000-branded locations, some with convenience stores under the On the Go name.

In 2013 Clark Brands acquired the brand licensing business of Crown Central Petroleum.

References

Companies based in Naperville, Illinois
Companies based in Milwaukee
Companies based in DuPage County, Illinois
Economy of the Midwestern United States
Economy of the Southeastern United States
Economy of the Southwestern United States
Oil companies of the United States
Gas stations in the United States
Clark Oil
Retail companies established in 1932
Energy companies established in 1932
1932 establishments in Wisconsin